Song Han-Bok (born 12 April 1984) is a South Korean football defender, who currently plays for Cheonan City in Korea National League. His previous clubs were Ulsan Hyundai, Jeonnam Dragons, Daegu FC, Gwangju FC and he also played for Gwangju Sangmu while fulfilling his compulsory military service.

Career statistics

References
Korean FA Cup match result

External links 

1984 births
Living people
Association football midfielders
South Korean footballers
Ulsan Hyundai FC players
Jeonnam Dragons players
Gimcheon Sangmu FC players
Daegu FC players
K League 1 players
Korea National League players